Ovidiu Ionescu (born 28 June 1989) is a Romanian professional table tennis player who plays with Post SV Mühlhausen and SCM Gloria Buzău.

Career
Ionescu competed at the 2016 Summer Olympics in the singles event, in which he was eliminated in the third round by Marcos Freitas.

In September 2018, Ionescu reached his first European Championships final but lost to No.1 seed Timo Boll. He defeated holder of the continental title Emmanuel Lebesson in the second round, 6th seed Jonathan Groth in the round of 16, 9th seed Vladimir Samsonov in the quarterfinals and 8th seed Kristian Karlsson in the semi-finals.

Titles
 Romanian Championships: 3 Singles Titles (2015, 2016, 2017)
 Single European Runner-Up 2018
 European Championships: 2 Mixed Doubles Bronze Medal together with Bernadette Szőcs (2012, 2016)

Clubs
Ionescu has been playing in Germany since 2005. He entered the World Singles Rankings – Top 100 for the first time in 2016.

References

External links

1989 births
Living people
Romanian male table tennis players
Olympic table tennis players of Romania
Table tennis players at the 2016 Summer Olympics
People from Buzău
World Table Tennis Championships medalists
Table tennis players at the 2019 European Games
European Games medalists in table tennis
European Games silver medalists for Romania
Table tennis players at the 2020 Summer Olympics
20th-century Romanian people
21st-century Romanian people